Willo Davis Roberts (May 29, 1928 – November 19, 2004) was an American writer, known primarily for children's mystery and suspense novels.

Biography
Willo Louise Davis was born in Grand Rapids, Michigan. In 1949, she married David W. Roberts. She was originally trained as a paramedic and began writing in her spare time. Her first book, "Murder At Grand Bay," (published in 1955) was written for an adult market. She won Edgar Allan Poe Awards ("Edgars") in 1989, 1995, and 1997 for best juvenile and best young adult mysteries. Her books included The View from the Cherry Tree, Twisted Summer, Sugar Isn't Everything, Don't Hurt Laurie, Megan's Island, Baby-Sitting Is a Dangerous Job, Hostage, The Girl with the Silver Eyes, The One Left Behind, Scared Stiff, Caught!, and Undercurrents.

Roberts died of congestive heart failure at the age of 76 in Granite Falls, Washington.  According to publisher Simon & Schuster, "The One Left Behind would have been her hundredth book for children."

References

External links 

 
 
 Willo Davis Roberts at Fantastic Fiction
 Willo Davis Roberts at publisher Simon & Schuster
 "On writing mysteries for young people"  at CBC Magazine, The Children's Book Council (archived 2007-09-27)

1928 births
2004 deaths
American children's writers
American mystery novelists
Edgar Award winners
Writers from Grand Rapids, Michigan
Women mystery writers
American women children's writers
American women novelists
20th-century American novelists
20th-century American women writers
Novelists from Michigan
People from Snohomish County, Washington
21st-century American women